Sven Sixten (1929–2001)  was a Swedish priest, author and poet. He published three novels: Friday, The Last Days of Johansson and The Green Valley.

References 

1929 births
2001 deaths